Ethereal Veiled Existence is the second demo, home recorded by Dutch symphonic black metal band Carach Angren. All tracks are based on a haunting called Brown Lady of Raynham Hall, known from the worlds' most famous ghost-picture, taken in 1936. Recorded & produced at the Wijers residence in Well (Netherlands) during August/September 2005. It was limited to 300 copies.

Track listing

Personnel 
Credits adapted from the album's liner notes.

Carach Angren
 Dennis "Seregor" Droomers - vocals, bass, guitars, lyrics, cover artwork
 Clemens "Ardek" Wijers - synthesizer, piano, mixing, mastering 
 Ivo "Namtar" Wijers - drums

Other
 Erik "Negakinu" Wijnands - photography

References 

Carach Angren albums
2005 EPs